H. Dimurthala Stadium, previously known as Lampineung Stadium is a football-specific stadium located in Banda Aceh, Aceh, Indonesia. The stadium holds 20,000 people and it is a homebase for Persiraja Banda Aceh and Liga 3 club Kuala Nanggroe.

Facilities
Since the stadium is mainly used for football match, it does not have athletic track. It has dressing rooms, a secretariat room, and a press conference room. The single seats are only available for VIP at the west tribune. Since 2018, all tribunes have been roofed.

Usage
It is currently used mostly for football matches. Besides that, it was also used for government employment test and as a venue for music concerts, such as: Peterpan and Maher Zain.

References

Banda Aceh
Sports venues in Banda Aceh
Football venues in Indonesia
Sports venues completed in 1957
Multi-purpose stadiums in Indonesia
Buildings and structures in Banda Aceh